Alun-Wyn Davies is a Welsh rugby union player who was previously a prop for Coventry R.F.C. As of January 2011 he now plays hooker for Llandovery R.F.C. Alun travelled north at 18 to join the Leeds Rhinos academy for a season before returning to the Neath RFC, then Swansea RFC for over 9 years as well as representing The Ospreys in 2004–05.

Alun has been a scrum and defence coach for over 14 years, coaching Ospresy academy5 years, 4 six nations and a World Cup in 2014 with welsh women’s national team. 5 years as director of rugby at Cardiff University after sending 3 years with welsh premiership club Bridgend ravens as scrum and defence coach and in 2022 taking over as head coach.

References

Welsh rugby union players
Living people
Year of birth missing (living people)
Place of birth missing (living people)
Ospreys (rugby union) players
Coventry R.F.C. players